Ursula Burton is an American actress, director and producer best known for her work on The Office. With her Five Sisters Productions company banner she has produced films including Just Friends (1997), Temps (1999), Manna From Heaven (2002), which the Los Angeles Times called a "warmhearted comedic fable" and in which she played the role of Theresa. Manna From Heaven was invited to screen for Congress at the MPAA by Senator Chuck Schumer and Representative Karen McCarthy, and hosted by Jack Valenti.

Filmography

Film

Television

Other works

Notes 

Living people
American women film producers
1966 births
21st-century American women